Kurseong College is a co-educational institute of higher learning and the oldest college in Kurseong, Darjeeling. It offers undergraduate courses in arts, commerce and science and is affiliated to the University of North Bengal.

Courses and specialisms

Departments

Science

Chemistry 
Physics 
Mathematics
Botany
Zoology

Arts and Commerce

English
Nepali
Urdu
History
Geography
Political Science
Philosophy
Economics
Commerce

Accreditation
The college is recognised by the University Grants Commission (UGC). It has been re-accredited and awarded B grade by the National Assessment and Accreditation Council (NAAC).

Facilities 
 Library
{| class="wikitable"
|Year of Establishment
|1967
|-
|Library Hours
|10:00 a.m. – 3:00 p.m.(Monday to Friday)
10:00 a.m. – 1:00 p.m.(Saturday)
|-
|Total books collection as on 31/03/2017
|22,244
|-
|Carpet Area
|2530 square feet
|-
|Sitting Capacity in a Reading Room
|60
|-
|Library Access
|Mixed Access
|-
|Status of Automation
|Under Process
|-
|Library Software
|Koha
|-
|Number of Staff
|5
|}
 Student canteen
 Science laboratory
 Girls hostel -  A Girls’ hostel is located within the college campus. It can provide accommodation to 24 boarders

See also

References

External links
Kurseong College
University of North Bengal
University Grants Commission
National Assessment and Accreditation Council

Universities and colleges in Darjeeling district
Colleges affiliated to University of North Bengal
Educational institutions established in 1967
1967 establishments in West Bengal